These are the 1977 Five Nations Championship squads:

England

Head coach: Peter Colston

 Bill Beaumont
 Martin Cooper
 Barry Corless
 Fran Cotton
 Robin Cowling
 Peter Dixon
 Alastair Hignell
 Nigel Horton
 Charles Kent
 Tony Neary
 Mike Rafter
 Mike Slemen
 Steve Smith
 Peter Squires
 Roger Uttley (c.)
 Peter Wheeler
 Malcolm Young

France

Head coach: Jean Desclaux

 Jean-Michel Aguirre
 Jean-Luc Averous
 Jean-Pierre Bastiat
 Roland Bertranne
 Gérard Cholley
 Jacques Fouroux (c.)
 Dominique Harize
 Jean-François Imbernon
 Alain Paco
 Michel Palmie
 Robert Paparemborde
 Jean-Pierre Rives
 Jean-Pierre Romeu
 François Sangalli
 Jean-Claude Skrela

 France used the same 15 players during the competition

Ireland

Head coach: Roly Meates

 Stephen Blake-Knox
 Jimmy Bowen
 Ned Byrne
 Shay Deering
 Willie Duggan
 Anthony Ensor
 Thomas Feighery
 Raymond Finn
 Brendan Foley
 Mike Gibson
 Tom Grace (c.)
 Ronnie Hakin
 Moss Keane
 Robbie McGrath
 Ian McIlrath
 Alistair McKibbin
 Stewart McKinney
 Freddie McLennan
 Charles Murtagh
 Phil Orr
 Michael Quinn
 John Robbie
 Fergus Slattery
 Harold Steele
 Pa Whelan
 Frank Wilson

Scotland

Head coach: Bill Dickinson

 Jim Aitken
 Ian Barnes
 Mike Biggar
 Alex Brewster
 Sandy Carmichael
 Alastair Cranston
 Lewis Dick
 Bill Gammell
 Andy Irvine
 Wilson Lauder
 Alan Lawson
 Don MacDonald
 Duncan Madsen
 Ian McGeechan (c.)
 Alastair McHarg
 Doug Morgan
 Norman Pender
 Jim Renwick
 David Shedden
 Billy Steele
 Alan Tomes
 Bill Watson
 Ron Wilson

Wales

Head coach: John Dawes

 Phil Bennett (c.)
 Clive Burgess
 David Burcher
 Terry Cobner
 Gerald Davies
 Gareth Edwards
 Gareth Evans
 Trefor Evans
 Steve Fenwick
 Allan Martin
 Graham Price
 Derek Quinnell
 Glyn Shaw
 Jeff Squire
 Geoff Wheel
 Clive Williams
 J. J. Williams
 J. P. R. Williams
 Bobby Windsor

References

External links
1977 Five Nations Championship at ESPN

Six Nations Championship squads